Gold and Green is the fourth studio album and  first Christmas album from American  country music duo Sugarland. The album was released on October 13, 2009, through Mercury Records Nashville. It features five original songs penned by group members Jennifer Nettles and Kristian Bush and five traditional holiday songs that were also previously included as part of a Wal-Mart-exclusive re-release of the duo's 2006 album Enjoy the Ride.

Critical reception
Thom Jurek of Allmusic gave a two-star review, calling it "an obvious, cloying exercise in marketing" and saying that it "holds little artistic merit." Paste critic Cory Albertson similarly said, "Gold and Green’s schizophrenic tone seems tailored for mass consumption by country radio and the soccer-mom set, but most other listeners will need far more eggnog to stomach such uninspired holiday cheer." Matt Bjorke reviewed it positively on Roughstock, saying, "City of Silver Dreams" could actually find itself a seminal holiday song like Joni Mitchell’s "River" as it tells a wonderfully soft and melodic story of New York City and the beauty of a new romance within the context of Christmas."  The song was co-written with Lisa Carver and Ellis Paul.

Track listing

Personnel
Sugarland
 Kristian Bush - acoustic guitar, electric guitar, mandolin, lead vocals, background vocals
 Jennifer Nettles - piano, lead vocals, background vocals

Additional Musicians
 David Angell - violin
 Robert Bailey - background vocals
 Thad Beaty - banjo, acoustic guitar, background vocals
 Brandon Bush - Hammond B-3 organ, keyboards, percussion, piano, string arrangements
 John Catchings - cello
 Annie Clements - background vocals
 Eric Darken - percussion
 David Davidson - violin
 Dan Dugmore - banjo, dobro, acoustic guitar, electric guitar, steel guitar
 Kim Fleming - background vocals
 Byron Gallimore - upright bass, electric guitar
 Vicki Hampton - background vocals
 Travis McNabb - drums, percussion
 Dow Tomlin - bass guitar
 Kris Wilkinson - viola
 Glenn Worf - bass guitar

Chart performance
Album
Gold and Green debuted at No. 12 on the U.S. Billboard Top Country Albums chart; it has since risen to a peak of No. 3 on the chart. During the 2009 holiday season, the set sold approximately 256,000 copies.

End of year charts

References

Sugarland albums
2009 Christmas albums
Albums produced by Byron Gallimore
Christmas albums by American artists
Country Christmas albums 
Mercury Nashville albums